Trato Hecho, Spanish for "Done deal" or "It's a deal", may refer to:

Trato Hecho (U.S. game show), the Spanish language version of Let's Make a Deal in the United States
Trato Hecho (Argentina), the Argentine version of  Deal or No Deal
Trato Hecho (Peru), the Peruvian version of Deal or No Deal
Deal or No Deal (Chile), the Chilean version of Deal or No Deal, which originally used the Trato Hecho name